Hyderabad Literature Festival is an annual literary gathering organized by Academy for Promotion of Art, Literature and Literacy (APAL) in Hyderabad, Sindh.

History
The festival was first held in April 2016 at Hyderabad Sports Club near Niaz Stadium Hyderabad for three days, from 15 to 17 April. The second event held in 2017 from 6-8 January in the Sindh Museum, Qasimabad, Hyderabad.

A number of prominent public figures have participated in the event including politicians Rasool Bux Palijo, Syed Sardar Ali Shah, Hamida Khuhro, Sassui Palejo, journalists Naseer Mirza, Wusatullah Khan, writers Amar Jaleel, Haleem Baghi and others.

Third HLF was organized by APAL in collaboration with Culture, Tourism and Antiquates Department and Information and Archives Department, Sindh. It was held from 17-19 January 2018, at Sindh Museum, Hyderabad. 30 sessions were conducted by renowned scholars, youth activists, prominent personalities and rising youngsters.

Event occurred from 11-13 January, 2019 for the fourth time. This time talks surrounded around Shah Abdul Latif Bhittai, Manchar Lake and other issues related with tourism in Sindh. Provincial minister of education in Sindh Syed Sardar Shah concluded the session.

Event occurred for two days from 20 to 21 March in 2021 at Sindh Museum Hyderabad.

Festival 
Event compromises of a number of sessions that aim at highlighting social issue of Sindh, Sindhi Culture, issues related with Sindhi language, developments in Sindhi literature. Book stalls, film screenings, mushaira sessions and musical sessions of folk singers are also arranged during event.

See also

 Sindh Literature Festival

References 

Sindhi culture
Literary festivals in Pakistan
Festivals in Sindh
Events in Sindh